Exchange Bridge (Birzhevoy most) is a bascule bridge in Saint Petersburg, opened in 1894. The bridge crosses the Little Neva River (distributary of Neva River) close to the Exchange Square and connects the Vasilyevsky and Petrogradsky islands.

It takes its name from the Old Saint Petersburg Stock Exchange (also Bourse) located nearby.

The closest metro station is Sportivnaya.

Timeline 
 1894 - the original wooden bridge was built
 1922 - the bridge was renamed to Builders' Bridge
 1956 - major reconstruction
 1989 - the bridge was renamed back to Exchange Bridge

See also 
 List of bridges in Saint Petersburg

Sources 

 St. Petersburg encyclopedia

Bridges in Saint Petersburg
Bridges completed in 1894